Christians are a religious community residing in the Indian state of Jharkhand. As per 2011 Census of India, 4.3% of people in Jharkhand are Christians. Christians are majority in Simdega district of Jharkhand.

History
Christianity is a minority religion in Jharkhand, a state of India. Most people in Jharkhand are followers of Sarnaism & Hindus. Jharkhand is known for tribals such as Munda, Santhal, Oraon and Kharia. A Roman Catholic Archdiocese of Ranchi exists. St. Mary's Cathedral in Ranchi has been a cathedral since 1909. The Church of North India has a Diocese of Chota Nagpur with a seat at Ranchi. The Church of North India has a St. Paul's Cathedral in Ranchi. Gossner Theological College is in Jharkhand. Many Munda & Kharia are Christians. The then pope visited Ranchi in 1986. The Gossner Evangelical Lutheran Church in Chotanagpur and Assam has its seat in Ranchi. Dhanbad has Oriental Orthodox Churches. Christian missionaries arrived in today's Jharkhand in 1845.

Pre-migration era

By the year 1765 Britishers were successful in their military mobilization to bring Santhal Pargana under British rule. After this conquest, the British colonial planters in India indentured tribal people of the Chota Nagpur Plateau region into Northeast India about 150 years ago for the purpose of being employed in the tea gardens industry as workers and came to be known as Tea tribes. These tribals were influenced by the Christian missionaries who came along with the British. These Christian missionaries worked for the improvement standard of living and providing education to the children of the tribals. 
Nearly 15 decades later missionaries from Germany left started their voyage to India in 1844 and reached Kolkata (formerly Calcutta) in 1845. These missionaries were initially heading for Mergui in Myanmar (formerly Burma) in view of preaching the Christian faith among the Karen people or in the areas located in the footsteps of the Himalayas. However, on meeting some people from Ranchi, they changed their plan and headed for Chhotanagpur and its main town, Ranchi. They reached Ranchi on 2 November 1845 and camped on, what is now known as, the 'Bethesda Ground' in Ranchi.

Post-migration era
After India became independent, the missionaries who remained post independence, worked for the improvement standard of living and providing education to the children of the tribals. Evidently many of the tribals emerged as sportsmen especially in the game of hockey and football. 

Even the first Prime Minister of India, Dr. Jawaharlal Nehru, in his The Discovery of India acknowledges the contribution of the early missionaries for development of tribals dialect stating that 
even laboured at the dialects of the primitive hill and forest tribes...

Statistics

Demographics
See article: Tribes of Jharkhand.

The Christians are mostly from the adivasi or tribal communities of the state with the major tribes as below with number of Christians and percentage of Christians in each tribe.

Churches and ministry

The major denominations and church bodies in the state are given below.

 Roman Catholic Church having 1,058,812 members in 8 dioceses and 280 parishes.

 Gossner Evangelical Lutheran Church having 583,960 members in 1,895 congregations.

 North Western Gossner Evangelical Lutheran Church having 135,000 members in 735 congregations.

The other smaller denominations are:
 India Pentecostal Church of God
 Dipti Mission
 Bihar Mennonite Mandli 
 Gospel Echoing Missionary Society

Source:

References